Ivinhema is a municipality located in the Brazilian state of Mato Grosso do Sul. Its population was 23,232 (2020) and its area is 2,010 km².

Agropecuary, and pecuary.
Mayor City: Juliano Ferro

References

External links 
  

Municipalities in Mato Grosso do Sul